San Carlos de Bolívar (or simply Bolívar) is a town in Buenos Aires Province, Argentina. It is the administrative centre for Bolívar Partido.

The Instituto Nacional de Tecnología Agropecuaria has a campus in Bolívar.

San Carlos de Bolívar is the hometown of the Club Ciudad de Bolívar, the most successful team of the Argentine volleyball league.

Climate

References

External links
 San Carlos de Bolívar Official Site

  La Mañana newspaper

Populated places in Buenos Aires Province
Populated places established in 1878